In Myanmar, military rank system and insignia are used by the Myanmar Armed Forces, its auxiliary services, some government departments and some civilian organizations.

All the government employees are called "civil service personnel" (. Their ranks and appointments are grouped into two category: 
 Officer or gazetted officer, whose promotion and posting are recorded in the Gazette of Myanmar
 Staff, ranks below the gazetted officers.

Personnels of the Armed Forces and the Police Force are included in the civil service personnels but the rules of civil service personnels are not applied to them because of the special nature of their duties.

The rank insignia of Myanmar Armed Forces is the basic form for all other rank insignia in Myanmar.
 Some departments/organizations use the same insignia as that of the Armed Forces but with different colour, (example: rank insignia of Myanmar Police Force use silver stars instead of golden ones). 
 Some use the same style as that of the Armed Forces but with organization's symbol in place of military stars (example: rank insignia of Myanmar Red Cross Society use red crosses in place of rank stars). 
 Those departments that don't use the military-like uniform system, use the pin badges with rank insignia (example: rank insignia of General Administration Department).

Myanmar Armed Forces 
All three branches of Myanmar Armed Forces — Myanmar Army, Myanmar Navy and Myanmar Air Force — use the same rank system and insignia, the same rank titles in Burmese. But the English translations of titles are different according to the branch. For example, the three-star general rank in Burmese is "" (bauilaʻ khayupaʻ) for all three branches, but for the English translation, it is "Major General" for Army and Air Force, while it is "Vice Admiral" for the Navy.

Officers
In Myanmar Armed Forces, the officer cadets graduated from Defense Services Academies (DSA, DSMA, DSTA, etc.) and Officer Training Schools (OTS) are directly appointed as gazetted officers with the rank of Second lieutenant.

The Armed Forces has a unique general officer rank: Vice-senior general, a rank between the five-star rank of Senior general and the four-star rank of General/Admiral. It is also a four-star rank but it is higher than the ordinary General or Admiral.

Special insignia of general/flag officers 
In addition to the regular rank insignia, the general/flag officers have additional ones, that are only for them.

Staffs 
These unofficial ranks are in used throughout the daily life of all branches of Myanmar Armed Forces. Insignia-wearing staffs within the Myanmar Armed Forces are usually seasoned veteran soldiers with wide-ranging experience of the battlefield, thus both officers and enlisted men refer to them as "teacher" out of respect as well as affection.

Myanmar Police Force 
Myanmar Police Force is an independent department of the Ministry of Home Affairs, one of the ministries under administration of Commander-in-Chief of Defence Services. The rank insignia of Myanmar Police Force are the insignia of Myanmar Armed Forces with different colours and with different titles.

Officers 
In the Myanmar Police Force, a person of the rank of Police second lieutenant and above is called an officer; while an officer of the rank of Police Captain and above is called a gazetted officer.

Staffs

Prisons Department 
Prisons Department is a department of the Ministry of Home Affairs, one of the ministries under administration of Commander-in-Chief of Defence Services. The rank insignia of its officers are the same as that of Myanmar Police Force but with different titles.

Officers

Staffs

General Administration Department 
General Administration Department is a department of the Ministry of Home Affairs, one of the ministries under administration of Commander-in-Chief of Defence Services. As its uniform is not the military style, pin badges are used to show ranks.

Officers

Staffs

References 

 
Ranks
Military insignia